Todd Huston is an American  politician serving as the current Speaker of the Indiana House of Representatives. A member of the Republican Party, Huston has represented the 37th district of the Indiana House since 2012. He previously served on the Hamilton Southeastern School Board from 2002 to 2005, the Indiana State Board of Education from 2005 to 2009, and the Indiana Education Roundtable from 2006 to 2009. He also served as Chair of the Indiana Charter School Board from 2011 to 2012. Huston was elected to succeed Brian Bosma as Speaker on March 9, 2020.

Huston was a senior vice president at the College Board from 2012 until February 2022. He resigned from the post amid criticism of his position opposing critical race theory.

References

External links
 Todd Huston at Ballotpedia
 Project Vote Smart – Representative Todd Huston (IN) profile
 Our Campaigns – Representative Todd Huston (IN) profile
 State House Website

|-

21st-century American politicians
Living people
Speakers of the Indiana House of Representatives
Republican Party members of the Indiana House of Representatives
Indiana University Bloomington alumni
1972 births